Ravens Moreland is an American underground rock band created by Bruce Moreland in 1990. The band blended punk, post punk, and early industrial. Moreland also played bass for early LA punk band The Weirdos and helped form the iconic Post Punk group Wall Of Voodoo. Along with brother Marc Moreland, he was also the MC for the first LA punk club, The Masque punk club, where he went by the name Bruce Barf and often lit himself on fire while wrapped in duct tape. He also played in LA art punk band Nervous Gender. In 1998 he switched from bass and keyboards to guitar and lead vocals. He wrote all the songs and played all instruments except drums on the first record, Lock up Your Mothers. Ravens Moreland, current members include Linda LeSabre of Death Ride 69 and My Life with the Thrill Kill Kult and Tara Belle Gilbert. Ravens Moreland has released six albums all released on Ravens records and available through CDBaby and iTunes.

Discography 
 Lock Up Your Mothers — 1999
 Sin Has a Soundtrack — 2002
 Candy Bad and Pretty Things — 2006
 The Dirt on You — 2011
 Six — 2016

Rock music groups from California
Musical groups established in 1990